Sumangali is a 1971 Indian Malayalam film, directed by M. K. Ramu and produced by P. S. Veerappa. The film stars Sheela, Prasad, Kamalam and Sankaradi in the lead roles. The film had musical score by R. K. Shekhar.

Cast
Sheela
Prasad
M. L. Saraswathi
Kamala
Sankaradi
Bahadoor
T. R. Omana
Paul Vengola
Khadeeja
Baby Indira
Master Vijaykumar

Soundtrack
The music was composed by R. K. Shekhar and the lyrics were written by Sreekumaran Thampi.

References

External links
 

1971 films
1970s Malayalam-language films